Gounzoureye  is a rural commune in the Cercle of Gao in the Gao Region of south-eastern Mali. The commune includes the villages of Koima, Tchirissoro, Sadou, Lobou, Sidibé, Kosseye, Gorom Gorom, Kadji, Wabaria, Arhabou, Tacharane, Bagoundjé I and Bagoundjé II, which are all located on the banks of the River Niger. The administrative center (chef-lieu) is at the village of Wabaria. In the 2009 census the commune had a population of 30,772.

References

External links
.

Communes of Gao Region